Several ships have been named Vansittart:

 was launched at New York in 1807, under another name. She was captured c.1814 and new owners gave her the name Vansittart. She was initially a West Indiaman. Then between 1817 and 1837 she made seven voyages as a whaler in the British Southern Whale Fisheries. Thereafter she was a merchantman sailing out of Shields. She foundered on 2 February 1855.
 was a schooner of 108 tons burthen launched at Topsham.

See also
 - one of four vessels